San José District may refer to:

 Peru
 San José District, Azángaro, in Azángaro province, Puno region
 San José District, Lambayeque, in Lambayeque province, Lambayeque region
 San José District, Pacasmayo, in Pacasmayo province, La Libertad region
 Costa Rica
 San José District, Alajuela, in Alajuela (canton), Alajuela province
 San José District, Atenas, in Atenas (canton), Alajuela province
 San José District, Grecia, in Grecia (canton), Alajuela province
 San José District, Naranjo, in Naranjo (canton), Alajuela province
 San José District, San Isidro, in San Isidro (canton), Heredia province
 San José District, Upala (also known as Pizote), in Upala (canton), Alajuela province

See also
 San José (disambiguation)